Ranma ½: Hard Battle, known as  in Japan and as just Ranma ½ in Europe, is a 2-D fighting video game released by Masaya and DTMC for the Super Nintendo Entertainment System. It is based on the manga and anime series Ranma ½. Hard Battle is the second Ranma ½ game to be translated into English, this time keeping the original graphics, music, and names of the characters, though the voices were still dubbed into English.  The game's English translation (but not its English voice acting) was provided by Viz Media.

Gameplay 

Hard Battle has three modes of play: the standard one-player tournament mode, a two-player competitive mode, and a two-player five-character team challenge mode. There are ten characters in the game (twelve if Ranma and Pantyhose Taro's cursed forms are counted). All twelve characters are available for the two-player modes. After completing tournament mode Pantyhose becomes a playable tournament character. Happosai is unlockable by entering a code.

Play control is simpler than most other fighting games. Each of the SNES controller's buttons (plus the up arrow) can be assigned to activate one of four moves: jump, block, normal attack, and power attack. Different normal and power attacks can be triggered depending on a variety of factors, such as how far the attacker is from the opponent, if they are ducking, or if a directional arrow is pressed along with the attack button.

Instead of entering a series of directional movements and pressing an attack button to activate a special attack, most moves are done by holding the left, right, or down arrow in conjunction with an attack button for a few seconds and then releasing the attack button. The longer the attack button is held the stronger the attack will be. For instance, one of Ryoga's special attacks is the bandana throw. If held for several seconds he throws three bandanas instead of one. Many moves can also be executed while holding the block button.

Another feature of Hard Battle is the ability to recover from throws. By pressing an attack button after being thrown the character can attempt to land on his or her feet and take less damage. Unlike many fighting games, opponents never get stunned after being hit with powerful attacks or a combo.

Each character has his or her own story. In any case, the character is manipulated into fighting the other characters by Principal Kuno.

Characters
Ranma Saotome: Ranma can be played in his male or female form. In both forms Ranma can execute a double jump. He is a well rounded character, though female Ranma is faster while male Ranma is stronger. His only real weakness is his lack of long range attacks. Principal Kuno makes a deal with Ranma: if he can defeat eight opponents he will get passing grades in all his classes. After defeating everyone the Principal informs Ranma that skipping class is no way to go through life, and he will not get credit. The angry Ranma throws the Principal through a window. Ranma's special attacks include the Kachu Tenshin Amaguriken, Hiryu Shoten Ha, and Moko Takabisha. His stage is a riverside path under a bridge at different times of the day depending on the form (male Ranma's stage takes place during the morning, while female Ranma's takes place during the afternoon).
Ryoga Hibiki: Ryoga wakes up in Principal Kuno's office with no recollection of how he got there. The Principal tells him if he defeats eight opponents his memory will return. In the end Ryoga regains his memory: Principal Kuno hit him in the back of the head when he entered his office. Ryoga's special attacks include the Shishi Hokodan, bandana throw, and the Bakusai Tenketsu (which causes a wave of debris to travel along the ground, similar to Terry Bogard's power wave attack). Several of Ryoga's normal attacks involve his umbrella as well. Ryoga is as well balanced as Ranma, though he is not as fast. His stage is the rooftop of Furinkan High School at night.
Shampoo: Principle Kuno tells Shampoo a story about eight warriors who decided to fight each other to determine who was the strongest. Shampoo takes the story to heart and decides if she defeats the eight opponents, the principal has selected she will be strong and Ranma will like her. After defeating the eight opponents, the Principal informs Shampoo that she misinterpreted the story, and she has to start over by fighting Pantyhose. After winning the battle, Shampoo bemoans the fact that she cannot do anything right. The Principal, however, states because of her his "coconut overruneth with joy." Shampoo is the fastest character in the game and can also do a double jump. She has two special attacks: a charge attack with her bonbori and the rising sky dragon kick. Her stage is the top of a moving railcar.
Akane Tendo: Tired of having to fight off boys asking for a date, Akane asks the Principal to do something about it. So he sends her out to fight his eight most troublesome students. After defeating all eight opponents, the principal announces she must defeat ten people instead of eight (counting Pantyhose's cursed form as two people), and at this point Akane realizes she has been used. After defeating Pantyhose, the Principal announces there have been some changes in school policy. Rule #1: No fighting on school grounds. Enraged, Akane knocks out the Principal. Akane is not as fast as Ranma, but she has several useful basic attacks and two effective special attacks: a jumping uppercut and a dash punch. Her stage is the front yard of the Tendo Dojo.
Genma Saotome: In this game Genma appears only in his panda form. He is easily one of the strongest characters in the game, though is also quite slow. The elder Saotome has decided to stand up to his rebellious son. Principal Kuno advises Genma to start by making an example of his friends. After defeating Ranma and the other characters in the game, Genma is seen walking down a street covered with posters warning of a wild panda causing havoc over the city. His arsenal includes attacks with his signboard, a series of rapid jabs, and a rushing attack. His stage is Jusenkyo.
Hikaru Gosunkugi: The Principal approaches Gosunkugi and tells him he is always ready to listen to the wishes of his students. Gosunkugi replies his wish is to have Akane respect him. The Principal then tells him that while he was in Hawaii he studied how directions can influence people's destinies. He then tells Gosunkugi that if he can defeat eight opponents from eight different directions, Akane will respect him. After defeating all his opponents, the Principal dresses up like Akane and runs up to Gosunkugi, who is not fooled by the disguise. Gosunkugi's speed is average but he is not strong. His primary weapons are his straw voodoo doll (which he can throw or swing) and a hammer. His stage is a haunted Japanese temple. This is the only appearance that Gosunkugi makes in the Ranma ½ fighting games.
Ukyo Kuonji (spelled Ukkyo Kuonji in the manual): Principal Kuno talks up Ukyo's ego about how strong she is and how one of her strength could make any business prosper. This leads her to participate in the tournament. She fights with an assortment of spatulas. Her special attacks include throwing spatulas and firecrackers. After winning the tournament, she realizes the Principal was using her to get free food. Ukyo is fairly well balanced and has good reach when she swings her large spatula. Her stage is a wrestling ring with a giant Japanese okonomiyaki in the middle of it.
Mousse: As the story begins Mousse is consulting a fortune teller wearing a Hawaiian shirt. The fortune teller informs Mousse that if he wants to be happy he must defeat eight opponents. After beating all the opponents Mousse realizes he has been used and hovers over the principal with weapons drawn. Principal Kuno responds he is about to be attacked by a duck. Mousse uses a variety of weapons for his normal and special attacks, including swords, a ball and chain (which not only has good reach but can sometimes get as many as four hits in), a yo-yo, a swan-shaped potty (Fist of the White Swan), and a cat. His special attacks include egg bombs, a flurry of blows with different weapons, and diving at his opponent with clawed shoes (Takazumeken). His stage is a fighting arena.
Gambling King: King dreams of owning his own casino, but lacks the funds. Principal Kuno offers to give him some financial aid, but he must defeat eight opponents first. After defeating the eight opponents, the Principal informs King that he has one more fight. He bet the money he had saved up for the caisson on the last opponent. After defeating Pantyhose, The Principal allows King to open a casino next to his office. It turns out that King is a better fighter than a gambler because he cannot beat high school students at his games. He makes a variety of attacks with playing cards, dice, and a bow. King is perhaps the most challenging character to beat the game with. Although he is slow he is not exceptionally strong and most of his attacks are close range or of limited usefulness. His stage is the Tendo Dojo, which he has converted into a casino, as per his story arc. This is the only appearance that King makes in the Ranma ½ fighting games.
Pantyhose Taro: Principal Kuno tells Pantyhose if he collects eight signatures, he can make Happosai give him a new name. After defeating all the opponents, the Principal accuses Pantyhose of forging the signatures and suggests he fight the person who named him. Pantyhose defeats Happosai, but the old man passes out as Pantyhose demands a new name. The player can select his normal form or his cursed form. While human his only special attack is a leaping kick, but his strength and speed are good and his normal attacks are useful. The transformed Pantyhose is as strong (and slow) as Genma and can do a diving or charging special attack. His stage is a cliff overlooking the sea and, like Ranma's, it can be presented at different times of the day depending on which form of Pantyhose is being fought (human Pantyhose fights at night, while his monster form's stage is set at sunrise). At first, both of Pantyhose's forms can only be selected on Versus mode, and he is the final boss of the Single Player mode for the other characters. Defeating him unlocks him for the Single Player mode.
Happosai: Happosai's special attacks are a small projectile, his Happo-Fire Burst and extending his battle aura (which makes him look several times larger). His stage is a giant statue of Principal Kuno. Happosai is unplayable without a code, and only appears as the final boss if the player chooses Pantyhose in Single Player mode.

Reception 

Ranma ½: Hard Battle garnered generally favorable reviews from critics. Readers of Super Famicom Magazine voted to give the game a 23.13 out of 30 score, ranking among Super Famicom games at the number 41 spot in a 1993 public poll, and received an award in the character category. According to Famitsu and the Nikkei Marketing Journal, the title sold over 49,698 copies in its first week on the market due to the fighting game boom and popularity of its characters, selling out at many stores within the year. It sold approximately between 205,569 and 320,000 copies during its lifetime in Japan.

Retrospective reviews for Ranma ½: Hard Battle have been more mixed. It remains popular more than 25 years since its release and has been featured in competitive play at fighting game tournaments as a side event such as Evo Japan 2018.

See also
List of Ranma ½ video games

Notes

References

External links
Ranma 1/2: Hard Battle IGN entry
Michel Bohbot Illustration

1992 video games
DTMC games
Masaya Games games
Super Nintendo Entertainment System games
Super Nintendo Entertainment System-only games
Fighting games
Hard Battle
Video games based on anime and manga
Video games developed in Japan
Multiplayer and single-player video games
Ocean Software games
Atelier Double games